Gojage is a village in Belgaum district in the southern state of Karnataka, India.

References  st. No 78 of gojage

Villages in Belagavi district